Vitaly Medvedev (born 6 January 1977) is a retired sprinter from Kazakhstan. He competed at the 1996 and 2000 Olympics in the 100 m, but failed to reach the finals. His personal best is 10.13 s (1999). In 2004 he graduated from the University of Texas at El Paso with a degree in philosophy.

References

External links
 

1977 births
Living people
People from Almaty Region
Athletes (track and field) at the 1996 Summer Olympics
Athletes (track and field) at the 2000 Summer Olympics
Olympic athletes of Kazakhstan
Kazakhstani male sprinters
World Athletics Championships athletes for Kazakhstan
Athletes (track and field) at the 1998 Asian Games
Asian Games competitors for Kazakhstan
Kazakhstani people of Russian descent